Ali Kharmi  (born 31 August 1990) is a Saudi football player who currently plays for Baish as a forward.

Honours
Al-Fayha
Saudi First Division: 2016–17

Al-Hazem
MS League runners-up: 2017–18

Al-Ain
MS League third place: 2019–20

References

 

1990 births
Living people
Saudi Arabian footballers
Al Tuhami Club players
Ittihad FC players
Al-Tai FC players
Al Batin FC players
Al-Raed FC players
Al-Fayha FC players
Al-Hazem F.C. players
Al-Ain FC (Saudi Arabia) players
Al-Kawkab FC players
Bisha FC players
Baish FC players
Place of birth missing (living people)
Saudi First Division League players
Saudi Professional League players
Saudi Second Division players
Saudi Third Division players
Association football forwards